Klint Kesto is a former member of the Michigan House of Representatives representing a district primarily consisting of Wixom and Commerce Township.

Kesto has a bachelor's degree in political science from the University of Michigan and a law degree from Wayne State University. He worked as a staff attorney at the Wayne County Prosecutor’s office and also managed a family-owned restaurant shop before his election in 2012.

Kesto is a member of the Chaldean Catholic Church. He was the first Chaldean elected to the Michigan House of Representatives.

References

State House bio

American Eastern Catholics
American people of Iraqi descent
Chaldean Catholics
Living people
Republican Party members of the Michigan House of Representatives
Michigan lawyers
University of Michigan College of Literature, Science, and the Arts alumni
Wayne State University alumni
Year of birth missing (living people)
21st-century American lawyers
21st-century American politicians